Elizabeth Sharland, L.G.S.M., A.Mus. A., is an actress, author and producer. Her first book, From Shakespeare to Coward, was published in 1997 and she has since written six more books on the theatre, including The British on Broadway, A Theatrical Feast of London, and A Theatrical Feast of New York, as well as penning a novel, The Best Actress, promoted by the noted British public relations consultant Richard Fitzwilliams. She speaks regularly at book signings at venues such as the Players Club and National Arts Club in New York. Her most recent book is Passionate Pilgrimages from Chopin to Coward.

Early life
Sharland was born in Tasmania and studied at St Michael's Collegiate School, also taking private lessons in speech, drama and music. She won a scholarship to study at the Guildhall School in London, and left to take up studies there for two years, gaining a diploma in piano as well as in drama.

Her acting career began with her first professional job at the Felixstowe Repertory Company, after which she toured Australia for six months with London's Old Vic Company, alongside Katharine Hepburn and Robert Helpmann. She later lived in Tangier, where she taught music at the American School and performed as house pianist at the Velasquez Hotel.

After her marriage, she moved to Toronto, Ontario, Canada with her doctor husband who had accepted a position there. She joined the summer stock company The Straw Hat Players to tour Ontario.
She performed many roles for CBC Radio and CBC-TV dramas, including the General Motors Hour, with actors Gordon Pinsent, Barry Morse, Robert Goulet and Douglas Campbell.

Theatrical work: Paris, New York, London, and beyond
Sharland later went to live in Paris, France, where she opened her own English-speaking cafe-theatre, featuring new plays, and she details the experience in her 2008 book A Theatrical Feast in Paris which profiles many of the city's famous theatres and restaurants, including Le Grand Véfour.

In 1983, she re-located to New York City, and served as personal assistant to actor Yul Brynner on his final tour of the US in The King and I. She started writing plays, three of which were produced at American Theatre of Actors in New York. After Brynner's death, Sharland moved back to London, producing an anthology entitled Love From Shakespeare to Coward at the Theatre Museum, and she cast over 200 actors to work in it over six years.

Recent activities
Elizabeth Sharland's 2009 book, Passionate Pilgrimages, recounts her years of travelling through Europe and Africa, describing her journey to meet the American composer and writer Paul Bowles, and also offers memories of her family in Tasmania as well as the composers, writers and musicians she went to visit during her career. The book was launched at Hatchard's in London in May 2009, and also on board the RMS Queen Mary 2 in July 2009. Her latest book, Behind the Doors of Notorious Covent Garden is featured as part of New York Lincoln Center's New Books in the Performing Arts series, where Sharland is joined by actress Tammy Grimes and cabaret artist Steve Ross at a March 10, 2011 event at the Dorothy and Lewis B. Cullman Center.

She lectures regularly on board Cunard cruise ships, as well as for the American Australian Association, the Society for the Four Arts, the English Speaking Union in Palm Beach and New York, The University Club, the Harvard Club, the National Arts Club and the National Portrait Gallery in London. She also serves as food editor for the Palm Beach Society Magazine.

References

External links

Living people
Alumni of the Guildhall School of Music and Drama
Australian emigrants to Canada
Australian stage actresses
Australian theatre managers and producers
Writers from Tasmania
Actresses from New York City
Australian women memoirists
Year of birth missing (living people)
21st-century American women